Chaim Berlin (1832, Valozhyn – 1912, Jerusalem) (חיים ברלין) was an Orthodox rabbi and chief rabbi of Moscow from 1865 to 1889. He was the eldest son of the Netziv, Rabbi Naftali Zvi Yehuda Berlin.

Biography
Chaim Berlin was the son of Naftali Zvi Yehuda Berlin, the Netziv, and his first wife. Berlin initially learned with his father.

His connection to the House of David as a descendant of Rabbi Meir Katzenellenbogen, the Maharam of Padua, is detailed in The Unbroken Chain.

Berlin lived in Valozhyn, Belarus, where he was head of a rabbinical court. In 1891, his father appointed him head of the Valozhyn yeshiva. There was controversy regarding this appointment as many students felt that Rabbi Chaim Soloveitchik was more deserving to head the yeshiva.

Family
He was married to his first wife from 5608/1847 until her passing 5642/1882. He subsequently was married from approximately 5644/1884 until the passing of his second wife 5649/1889.

Career
He served as Chief Rabbi of:
 Moscow from 1865 to 1889
 Kobryn from 1892 to 1897
 Kropyvnytskyi (Elizavetgrad) from 1897 until 1906.

Berlin left Russia in 1906 and settled in Jerusalem. He became the assistant chief rabbi of the Ashkenazi community with Rabbi Shmuel Salant. He also assisted Rabbi Salant in the management of the Rabbi Meir Baal Haneis Salant charity founded by Rabbis Zundel and Salant in 1860. After Rabbi Salant died at the end of 1909, Berlin led the Jerusalem Rabbinate and the Rabbi Meir Baal Haneis Salant charity until his death in 1912 (5673).

Legacy
He died at age 81 on 13 Tishrei 5663 (September 24, 1912) and was buried in the Mount of Olives Jewish Cemetery in East Jerusalem.

Yeshiva Rabbi Chaim Berlin, established in Brooklyn, New York in 1904 as Yeshiva Tiferes Bachurim, was renamed for Rabbi Chaim Berlin in 1914, at the suggestion of his brother, Rabbi Meir Berlin (Bar-Ilan).

Writings
His major extensive writings were not published for nearly a century after his passing.This changed with three publications:
 2002: Sefer Nishmat Hayyim, She'elot u-Teshuvot (R. Ya'akov Kosovsky-Shachor ed., Beni-Brak, 412 pp.)
 2003: Sefer Nishmat Hayyim, Mamorim u'Mechtavim (R. Ya'akov Kosovsky-Shachor ed., Beni-Brak, 424 pp.)
 2008: ''Otzar Reb Hayyim Berlin, Shu"t Nishmat Hayyim, Jerusalem, 4 vol., 446, 462, 449, 298 pp.)

References

External links
 Biography of Rabbi Chaim Berlin
 

1832 births
1912 deaths
Ashkenazi rabbis in Ottoman Palestine
People from Valozhyn
People from Oshmyansky Uyezd
Belarusian Orthodox rabbis
19th-century rabbis from the Russian Empire
20th-century Russian rabbis
Chief rabbis of cities
Volozhin rosh yeshivas
Burials at the Jewish cemetery on the Mount of Olives